Chipping is a village and civil parish of the borough of Ribble Valley, Lancashire, England, within the Forest of Bowland Area of Outstanding Natural Beauty.  In the 2001 census, the parish had a population of 1,046, falling slightly to 1,043 at the 2011 Census. This Lancashire village has won several best-kept village competitions over the years. The village also won the village section of the Royal Horticultural Society Britain in Bloom competition in 2009 picking up RHS Tourism and Gold achievement awards in the process.

History

The village is known to be at least 1,000 years old and is mentioned in Domesday. It lies on the south-western edge of the ancient Forest of Bowland abutting the civil parish of Bowland-with-Leagram. Leagram Park, the site of one of the medieval deer parks of the Forest, is a short drive from the village. Despite this, Chipping was not a part of the ancient Forest and its manor did not fall within the powerful Lordship of Bowland.

Chipping really thrived during the Industrial Revolution when there were seven mills located along Chipping Brook. The last survivor was Kirk Mill, the chair making factory of HJ Berry, but in 2010 the company went into administration, the factory closed, and on 7 March 2011 the works were bought by 53N Bowland Ltd.

Origin of the name
Chipping is named in the Domesday Book as Chippenden; the name is derived from the medieval Chepyn meaning market place.

Local government
Chipping is a civil parish, and formerly an ancient parish that also included Thornley-with-Wheatley, which became a separate parish in the 19th century.  Chipping was in Clitheroe Rural District from 1894 until the reorganisation of local government in 1974,

It is now in Ribble Valley, a non-metropolitan district formed in 1974.  The parish of Chipping is combined, with Bowland-with-Leagram and Bowland Forest High, into the ward of Chipping, which elects one councillor to Ribble Valley Borough Council.  Local elections are every four years.

Chipping is part of the Longridge with Bowland ward of Lancashire County Council and is in the Ribble Valley parliamentary constituency.  At all three levels of government (district, county and parliament) Chipping is represented by the Conservative Party.

Religion

The village contains the Anglican Church of St Bartholomew and the Roman Catholic Chapel of St Mary, as well as a Congregational chapel.

St Bartholemew's
St Bartholomew's is an active Anglican parish church in the deanery of Whalley, the archdeaconry of Blackburn, and the diocese of Blackburn. Its benefice is united with that of St Michael, Whitewell.  The church is designated by English Heritage as a Grade II* listed building.

The ancient yew tree in the churchyard is well known in the county and thought to be more than a century old.

St Mary's
Until the Protestant Reformation all the people of the village worshipped at St. Bartholomew's. Those who remained devoted to the Roman Catholic Church practiced their religion in secret, although there was a Mass centre at Leagram Hall where the family remained Catholic.

By the beginning of the 19th century Catholics were now able to openly attend the chapel at Leagram. In the 1820s George Weld, who was squire of Leagram, donated land in the village for the construction of a church, a school, a priest's house and a cemetery. St Mary's Church was built at a cost of £1,130 (equivalent to £ in ) The day school, also built on the site, remained in use until 1967 when the new school was built. The old school is now a community centre for all the people of the village. In 1999 the church was fully redecorated and rearranged. The Priest in Charge is Fr. Anthony Grimshaw.

The organ was reputedly bought from Stonyhurst College in 1872 and it has been dated by experts from Preston and District Organist Association to be early 18th century, by Bishop Ltd of Ipswich. It was originally hand blown and contains 650 pipes. In 1944, when electric light was installed, a plate confirming its builder was discovered. It was further renovated in 1952, when an electric blower was installed, and a further inscription was found clarifying the re-building of the organ in 1872 by Henry Ainscough.

Congregational Chapel

The chapel now known as the Congregational Church was built in 1838 for use as an independent non-conformist place of worship. The dedication stone, on the front of the building, bears the inscription: PROVIDENT CHAPEL ERECTED BY SUBSCRIPTION MDCCCXXXVIII. After about 40 years the chapel declined. It closed in 1882 and remained so for about 18 years. After extensive restoration and cleaning, by members of the Grimshaw Street Congregational Church in Preston, however, it re-opened as a Congregational Church.

The church is currently active, with an average attendance at Sunday worship of approximately 60 with around 20 children meeting for Sunday school. It meets twice on a Sunday, in the morning and evening, and runs various groups for both young and old within the community.
In January 2014, the church appointed its first Pastor in over 50 years.

Landmarks

Chipping Craft Centre holds the honour of being the property which has been used as a shop for the longest continuous time in the UK. The first shop was opened at this location in 1668 by a local wool merchant. Since then it has been used as an undertakers, butchers and most recently as a Post Office, amongst other trades. It is a now a newsagents, tea shop and craft centre, however, and operates as a Post Office only two days a week.

Hesketh End, on Judd Holmes Lane in the village, is a Grade I listed building, dating from 1591 and early 17th century, restored in 1907.

Woolfen Hall, at the foot of nearby Parlick, is a Grade II listed building, possibly 16th-century but altered in 1867-8.

Education
The village has the benefit of two primary schools; St Marys RC and Brabin's Endowed School. Brabin's Endowed was established in 1684.

Culture and amenities
Chipping has its own local historical society.

Chipping Agricultural Show is a local country show that was first held in 1920. The show celebrates all aspects of farming and rural life with classes for sheep, cattle, light horses, ponies and shire horses plus poultry, pigeon and egg sections. There are also competitions for cheeses, handicrafts, cakes and preserves, a large horticultural section plus children's, dog and baby sections.

Originally held in 1998 and intended as a one-off fund raising event for a new Village Hall, Chipping Steam Fair has now become a firm fixture in the village calendar. The fair now regularly attracts around 20,000 visitors and upward of 500 exhibitors over the Spring Bank Holiday weekend each May.

One mile to the west of the village is Bowland Forest Gliding Club, GB-0339, which is used by winch-launched gliders.

The village has three public houses. The Sun is situated at the corner of Windy Street and Garstang Lane and The Tillotson's Arms is situated on Talbot Street. The Talbot Arms, also on Talbot Street, is currently closed for refurbishment. The Sun is reputed to be haunted by the ghost of scullery maid Lizzie Dean, who hung herself in the attic of the pub on 5 November 1835. She is buried at the entrance to the churchyard. Also in the locality is the Gibbon Bridge Hotel.

The village's environmentally friendly public toilets have won the best in Lancashire award at the county's Best Kept Village competition every year since a renovation in 2009.

Geography
Just to the north of the village the Forest of Bowland access areas of Clougha, Fair Snape, Wolf Fell and Saddle Fell have been opened up to the public by access agreements negotiated between Lancashire County Council and the owners.

Transport
Bus routes operated by Holmeswood Coaches connect Chipping to Blackburn, Clitheroe and Longridge. A route operated by Stagecoach in Lancashire connected Chipping to Preston but since 2012 no longer serves Chipping as a result of a Lancashire County Council review of subsidised bus services.

Chipping in fiction
The Wardstone Chronicles, written by Joseph Delaney, frequently features the village of Chipenden, which is based on the village of Chipping.

See also
Listed buildings in Chipping, Lancashire
Toponymy of England
List of generic forms in British place names

References

External links

Victoria County History – The parish of Chipping British History Online
St. Mary's R.C Primary School
Brabin's Endowed School, Chipping
Chipping Agricultural Show
Chipping Steam Fair
Chipping and Downham – Feasibility Study into the potential for zero carbon villages
Bowland Forest Gliding Club
Chipping Local History Society
Kirk Mill and former chairworks
Chipping Conservation Area Appraisal

Villages in Lancashire
Civil parishes in Lancashire
Geography of Ribble Valley
Aviation in Lancashire
Forest of Bowland